Erimo Seamount (also known as Sisoev Seamount) is a seamount off Hokkaido, Japan. Located close to the intersection between the Kuril-Kamchatka and Japan Trenches, it is in the process of being subducted. The Cretaceous seamount formed 100-120 million years ago and is covered by a limestone cap. Tiltmeters have been installed on its top.

Geography and geomorphology

Regional 

Erimo Seamount lies southeast of Cape Erimo of Hokkaido, Japan. The seamount lies close to the intersection between the Kuril–Kamchatka Trench to the northeast and the Japan Trench to the south, and is sometimes used to define the boundary. Other seamounts in the area are Takuyo-Daiichi to the east-northeast and Ryofu-Daini to the east-southeast, and there is evidence of another seamount northwest of Erimo and in the process of being subducted. Unlike other seamounts, Erimo is not part of a seamount chain. Possibly, as such a seamount or a seamount chain subducted it indented the trenches, forming a  re-entrant.

Local 

Erimo Seamount is cut by normal faults that run parallel to the Kuril-Kamchatka Trench, and the seamount is tilting and beginning to break apart as its subduction starts. The crust underneath Erimo contains the magnetic anomaly M8 and has an age of about 120 million years.

Volcanic rocks dredged from Erimo Seamount include alkali basalt, brecciated basalts, silty sandstone, trachyandesites or trachytes. As the seamount has entered the trench, further subsidence of about  has taken place.

Age 

Erimo Seamount formed in the Cretaceous in an off-ridge setting but close to a spreading center; it is about 100-120 million years old, while potassium-argon dating has yielded an age of 80 million years and argon-argon dating of 104 ± 9 million years. Cretaceous volcanic activity has generated seamounts all across the Western Pacific Ocean, but Erimo today is inactive. This seamount appears to be part of a large hotspot-generated seamount province whose youngest activity is currently located in French Polynesia.

References

Sources 

 
 
 
 
 

Cretaceous volcanoes
Seamounts of the Pacific Ocean
Guyots